Bassignani is a surname. Notable people with the surname include:
Giovanni Bassignani (1669–1717), Italian architect and engineer
Umberto Bassignani (1878–1944), Italian sculptor
Phillip Bassignani (born 1984), Rural Alaskan Aviator and mechanic 

Italian-language surnames